Arhopala bazaloides, the Tamil oakblue, is a species of lycaenid or blue butterfly found in Asia. Also known as Lycaenidae, they are members of the superfamily Papilionoidea, the true butterflies. This family has approximately 4,700 species that are unevenly distributed throughout the world, however the distribution of the Tamil oakblue is limited only to India, Myanmar and Sri Lanka.

Description

The adults are small, often brilliantly coloured with electric blues, reds, and oranges. Females lay single, sea urchin shaped eggs on host leaves or flower buds; the resulting caterpillars are typically slug shaped. In many species, caterpillars depend on ants for protection, so caterpillars produce sugary secretions that are collected by the ants, in a symbiotic relationship. Most individuals overwinter in either the egg or pupal stage.

The species was once considered as extinct from Sri Lanka, but rediscovered in 2014 from wet zone lowland forests of Sinharaja and Kanneliya.

References

Arhopala
Butterflies of Asia
Butterflies described in 1878
Taxa named by William Chapman Hewitson
Butterflies of Sri Lanka